The fourth election to the Carmarthenshire County Council was held in March 1898. It was preceded by the 1895 election and followed by the 1901 election.

Overview of the result

The Liberal Party once again retained a strong majority.

Candidates

42 candidates were returned unopposed, with only nine seats being contested, and several of these were between rival Liberal candidates. This was the highest number of uncontested seats since the council was created. Fourteen of those elected at the first election, and who had served continuosly since then, sought re-election

Of the retiring aldermen, only Gwilym Evans, former chairman of the council, sought election. He had been defeated for a Llanelli ward in 1892 but was now returned unopposed for a different ward.

Outcome

Although the number of contested elections was small, a number of wards were keenly contested. 

There were notable Liberal victories at Caio, where Sir James Hills-Johnes was defeated, and at Pembrey, where W.J. Buckley lost to the Liberal candidate David Evans. Buckley had been a member since 1889 and was parliamentray candidate for West Carmarthenshire.

The Conservatives, in turn, gained ground by winning a number of seats including St Clears and Llanboidy. In Llanelli, John Allen Williams, editor of the Llanelly Guardian, was returned unopposed as a Liberal Unionist.

Seven of the aldermanic seats were occuupied by Liberals with the newly elected aldermen including Sir James Hills-Johnes and John Williams, both of whom had been defeated at the polls. Two Conservatives were elected as aldermen, a net gan of one on the aldermanic bench.

Ward results

Abergwili

Bettws

Caio

Carmarthen Eastern Ward (Lower Division)

Carmarthen Eastern Ward (Upper Division)

Carmarthen Western Ward (Lower Division)

Carmarthen Western Ward (Upper Division)

Cenarth

Cilycwm

Conwil

Kidwelly

Laugharne

Llanarthney

Llanboidy

Llandebie

Llandilo Rural

Llandilo Urban

Llandovery

Llanedy

Llanegwad

Llanelly Division.1

Llanelly Division 2

Llanelly Division 3

Llanelly Division 4

Llanelly Division 5

Llanelly Division 6

Llanelly Division 7

Llanelly Division 8

Llanelly Rural, Berwick

Llanelly Rural, Hengoed

Llanelly Rural, Westfa and Glyn

Llanfihangel Aberbythick

Llanfihangel-ar-Arth

Llangadock

Llangeler

Llangendeirne

Llangennech

Llangunnor

Llanon

Llansawel

Llanstephan

Llanybyther

Mothvey

Pembrey North

Pembrey South

Quarter Bach

Rhydcymmerai

St Clears

St Ishmael

Trelech

Whitland

Election of Aldermen

In addition to the 51 councillors the council consisted of 17 county aldermen. Aldermen were elected by the council, and served a six-year term. Following the elections, the following aldermen were appointed by the newly elected council.

The following retiring aldermen were re-elected:

J.S. Tregoning, Iscoed, Conservative (retiring alderman) 43
John Lewis, Meirios Hall, Liberal (retiring alderman) 42
D.L. Jones, Derlwyn, Liberal (retiring alderman) 42
R.W. Stephens, Coedybrain, Liberal (retiring alderman) 41
David Evans, Llangennech, Liberal (retiring alderman)38

In addition, the following four new aldermen were elected:

Rev. William Davies, Llandilo, Liberal 38
James Hill-Johnes, Dolaucothy, Conservative (defeated candidate at Caio) 35
Rev. W. Thomas, Whitland, Liberal (elected member for Whitland) 38
John Williams, Llanginning, Liberal 35 (defeated candidate at St Clears)

One retiring alderman was elected as councillor but not re-elected as alderman:

Gwilym Evans, Liberal

Two aldermen were not re-elected

J. Bagnall Evans, Liberal 
Robert Scourfield, Llansteffan, Liberal

References

1898
1898 Welsh local elections